Jul, jul strålande jul is a 2001 Nils Börge Gårdh Christmas album.

Track listing
När det lider mot jul (Det strålar en stjärna) (Ruben Liljefors, Jeanna Oterdahl)
Jag är så glad var julekväll (trad.)
Församlens i trogne (John Francis Wade)
O Betlehem, du lilla stad (O Little Town of Bethlehem) (Lewis Redner, Anders Frostenson)
Det hände sig för länge sen (Mary's Boy Child) (Jester Hairston, Jan Erixon)
Jul, jul, strålande jul (Hugo Hammarström, Edvard Evers)
Betlehems stjärna (Viktor Rydberg, Alice Tegnér)
Jag drömmer om en jul hemma (White Christmas) (Irving Berlin, Karl Lennart)
Bereden väg för Herran (Frans Michael Franzén, trad.)
Stilla natt (Stille nacht, heilige nacht) (Franz Gruber, Oscar Mannström)
Nu tändas tusen juleljus (Emmy Köhler)
Julsång (Cantique de Noël) (Adolphe Adam)

Contributors
Nils-Börge Gårdh - vocals
Alf Andersson - keyboard
Joachim Sundler - drums, percussion
Bo Hellgren - bass
Conny Axelsson - guitar

References

2001 Christmas albums
Christmas albums by Swedish artists
Nils Börge Gårdh albums